Dr. Mohammed Shamsul Haque Bhuiyan (born 1 July 1948) is a Bangladesh Awami League politician and the incumbent Member of Parliament from Chandpur-4.

Early life
Dr. Bhuiyan was born in Chandpur District on 1 July 1948. His father's name is Mohammad Hasmat Ullah and mother's name is Hazera Begum. He graduated with an MBA from the Institute of Business Administration, University of Dhaka. After which he completed his PhD.

Career
Dr. Bhuiyan was elected to Parliament from Chandpur-4 in 2014 as a Bangladesh Awami League candidate. He is the founder of Apollo University of Science and Technology in Chandpur. He is the chairman of Appolo Group of Companies. He is the chief executive officer of Destiny Group. He is the President of Chandpur District unit of Bangladesh Awami League.

References

Awami League politicians
Living people
10th Jatiya Sangsad members
1948 births
People from Chandpur District